La Paloma (English title: The Dove) is a Mexican telenovela produced by José Rendón for Televisa in 1995. Gerardo Hemmer and Maite Embil starred as protagonists. The telenovela was cancelled abruptly due to the death of its protagonist Gerardo Hemmer. It was supposed to go on after his death, however, after filming a couple more scenes, Televisa had decided to just cancel the novel altogether. It is, to date the only telenovela from Televisa that has suddenly gone off air, leaving it unfinished at just 50 episodes.

Plot 
Ramiro López Yergo owns a funeral home, and controls with an iron fist to his wife Teresa and three children. Although it appears to be of high moral character Ramiro has a lover, Lilia, and it is a corrupt and greedy man.

Cast 
 
Gerardo Hemmer as Rafael Estrada Fuentes
Maite Embil as Emilia López-Yergo Montenegro
Manuel Ojeda as Ramiro López-Yergo Aguilar
Arsenio Campos as Luis Alarcón
Yolanda Ventura as Lilia Rivero
Arath de la Torre as Paco Rivero
Joaquín Cordero as Gilberto Bernal
Delia Casanova as Elsa
Isaura Espinoza as Teresa Montenegro Tovar de López-Yergo
José María Yazpik as Ángel
Adriana Barraza as Mother Clara
Carolina Valsaña as Marcela
Martha Mariana Castro as Lorena
Marina Marín as Lucía
Antonio Miguel as Don Mario
Hernán Mendoza as Leonardo
Sergio Sánchez as Montaño
Lupita Lara as Toña
Óscar Flores as Neto
Samuel Loo as Enrique
Alejandra Morales as Alicia
Dalilah Polanco as Armida
Alisa Vélez as Pilar López Yergo
Fidel Garriga as Pedro
Lourdes Villarreal as Rosa
Abraham Ramos
Fernando Luján
Israel Jaitovich
Fabián Corres
Cuca Dublán
Raúl Askenazi
Gabriel Galván

Awards

References

External links

1995 telenovelas
Mexican telenovelas
1995 Mexican television series debuts
1995 Mexican television series endings
Mexican television series based on Brazilian television series
Spanish-language telenovelas
Television shows set in Mexico City
Televisa telenovelas